The 1987–88 Canada men's national ice hockey team represented Canada at the 1988 Winter Olympics held in Calgary, Alberta, Canada.

Background 
The 1988 Winter Olympics represented the first time that NHL players were allowed to compete in the Olympic games.

Canada's team qualified for the final round, but placed fourth and out of the medals in the Olympic tournament.

1988 Winter Olympics roster

Head coach: Dave King
Ken Berry
Serge Boisvert
Brian Bradley
Sean Burke
Chris Felix
Randy Gregg
Marc Habscheid
Bob Joyce
Vaughn Karpan
Merlin Malinowski
Andy Moog
Jim Peplinski
Serge Roy
Wally Schreiber
Gord Sherven
Tony Stiles
Steve Tambellini
Claude Vilgrain
Tim Watters
Ken Yaremchuk
Trent Yawney (C)
Zarley Zalapski

See also
 Canada men's national ice hockey team
 Ice hockey at the 1988 Winter Olympics
 Ice hockey at the Olympic Games
 List of Canadian national ice hockey team rosters

References

 
Canada men's national ice hockey team seasons